City Fallen Leaves is the fifth album by British indie pop band Comet Gain.

Track listing

References

2005 albums
Comet Gain albums
Kill Rock Stars albums